Sisters of Bethany may refer to:

 The Sisters of Bethany, an order of Benedictine nuns affiliated with a convent beside the Tomb of Lazarus during the Crusades
 Benedictine Sisters of Bethany (EBSB), an Anglican order of nuns in Cameroon
 Society of the Sisters of Bethany (SSB), an Anglican order of sisters in Hampshire, England